Eliza Jane Gillett Bridgman (1805–1871) was a pioneer educational missionary in China. She was born in Derby, Connecticut, to Canfield and Hannah Gilett. Graduating at age sixteen, she became an assistant teacher at the boarding school from which she graduated. She continued her career in education and was appointed principal at another boarding school at age twenty-two.

Missionary career in China 

Gillett followed her childhood desire to be a missionary and was appointed as one to China with the Protestant Episcopal Church on November 14, 1843. Although the mission board was reluctant to appoint unmarried women, she became one of three unmarried women to be appointed under the church's new China mission. In 1844, she sailed to China with Rev. William Jones Boone. After arriving in Hong Kong, Eliza soon met Dr. Rev. Elijah Coleman Bridgman. Bridgman believed that Eliza was his answer to his prayer for a wife; he proposed and the two were married on June 28, 1845, in Colonial Chapel. After marrying, she joined her husband and transferred her ministries to the Congregational Church. Together, the Bridgmans began their missionary work in Canton. The couple adopted two small girls and moved to Shanghai, where Eliza began the first Protestant girls' school there.

In 1862 she was forced to take a furlough in the United States due to health concerns after her husband's death, during which she was run over by a sled. Bridgman returned to Peking in 1864, where she opened up Bridgman Girls' College after obtaining substantial land. The Teng Shih K'ou Congregational Church was built in the same year, as part of the college. The academy later became the Women's College of Yenching University and is credited with educating a large number of female Chinese leaders.

Eliza Jane Gillett Bridgman is buried in Shanghai next to her husband Elijah Bridgman.

Works 
Elijah Coleman Bridgman, ed. Eliza Jane Gillett Bridgman (1864). The Pioneer of American Missions in China: The Life and Labors of Elijah Coleman Bridgman.
Eliza Jane Gillett (1853) Daughters of China; or, Sketches of Domestic Life in the Celestial

References

1805 births
1871 deaths
American Anglican missionaries
People from Derby, Connecticut
American expatriates in China
American Congregationalist missionaries
Anglican missionaries in China
Congregationalist missionaries in China
Female Christian missionaries
Burials in Shanghai